Helena Anliot (born 26 September 1956) is a Swedish former tennis player. She was seeded 6 in the 1977 Australian Open.

WTA career finals

Singles: 2 (2 runner-ups)

Doubles: 5 (4 titles, 1 runner-up)

ITF finals

Singles (8–5)

Doubles (5–8)

References

External links
 
 
 

Swedish female tennis players
1956 births
Living people
People from Falun
Sportspeople from Dalarna County
20th-century Swedish women
21st-century Swedish women